Blane is an offshore oil field located in the southern Norwegian and northern British sectors of North Sea. The field was discovered in 1989 and produces high quality oil.

Ownership
Talisman Energy (UK) Limited is the operator with 25.002% of interest in the project. Other partners include Roc Oil Company Limited (12.501%), MOC Exploration (UK) (13.994%), Eni UK Limited (13.897%), Eni ULX Limited (4.105%), Dana Petroleum (BVUK) Limited (12.501%), Talisman Energy Norge AS (18.000%). Initial investment in the field was £250 million.

Production
Development drilling started on 13 May 2006. The production started on 12 September 2007. Blane field, tied to Ula platform, consists of two horizontal production wells with gas lift and one water injection well. The field produces  and it is expected production will reach . Production involves utilization of pressure support from injection of water produced from Tambar, Blane and Ula fields.

See also

Ula oil field
Oselvar oil field
Tambar oil field
Norpipe
North Sea oil
Economy of Norway
Economy of the United Kingdom

References

External links
Talisman Energy official website

North Sea oil fields
Oil fields in Norway
Oil fields of the United Kingdom
1989 establishments in Norway
1989 establishments in the United Kingdom